Miao Quansun (20 September 184422 December 1919), courtesy name Yanzhi, was a Chinese philologist, historian, educationalist, bibliographer and librarian. He oversaw the foundation of the Jiangnan Library in Nanjing and was the first administrator of the National Library of China in Beijing.

Other names

Miao Quansun was also known by other names. In older Romanisations, his name may also be rendered Miao Ch'üan-sun.

Early life

Miao Quansun was a native of Miaojia, a village in Shengang Town, Jiangyin, Jiangsu province. He was born on 20 September 1844 (the 24th year of the Daoguang Emperor) into a family of officials. His grandfather, Miao Tinghuai, served as the prefectural magistrate of Pingliang in Gansu, and his father, Miao Huanzhang, passed the provincial imperial examination, but did not get an official position. Later, he served in the military command under Zhang Guoliang, but was dismissed in 1863 after anti-missionary riots in Qingyan and Kaizhou in 1861 and 1862.

His education progressed rapidly, completing his study of the Five Classics by the age of 11. When he was 17, the Taiping Army entered Jiangyin and he fled with his stepmother to Huai'an. At 21, he moved to Chengdu, where his studies continued. He passed the Sichuan provincial imperial exam at the age of 24. In 1876, the second year of the Guangxu Emperor's reign, at the age of 33, he passed the highest palace examination, gained the title of shujishi and entered the Hanlin Academy. He remained there for 7 years and assisted Zhang Zhidong, then an editor there, in compiling the Shun Tianfu Chronicles, a 130-volume gazetteer of the Beijing metropolitan area. This work was completed in 1885 and revised in 1889. He later resigned after disagreement with the head of the academy, Xu Tong. He spent the following ten years collating and editing written works.

Academic life 

In 1888, he was appointed as director of the Nanjing Academy, which, established in 1884 by Huang Tifang, was famous for its printing house. In 1891, he took charge of Luoyang Academy, in 1894 Zhongshan Adcademy in Nanjing and also the Longcheng Academy in Changzhou. In 1901, he served as the editor-in-chief of the Jiangchu Compilation and Translation Bureau. In 1902, Zhongshan Academy became the Jiangnan Advanced School, where he was the school principal. Following the implementation of the Guimao system for schools, the Jiangnan School was closed and the Office of the Governor of Liangjiang planned to "first set up a large normal school as a platform for educational affairs".

In May 1902, he became chief inspector of schools and was responsible for the preparation of the Sanjiang Normal School. He also traveled to Dongyang with seven other chairs, including Xu Naichang and Lui Yizheng to inspect academic affairs there.

In 1906, he learned that the great bibliophile and book collector Ding Bing had died. His "Mansion of Eight Thousand Volumes" was to be sold to the Seikadō Bunko Library. Miao bought the books instead for over 70,000 yuan and had them transferred to Nanjing.. In 1907, he was appointed to set up the Jiangnan Library, now the Nanjing Library. Also in that city, he oversaw the construction of the Taofeng Building,  which opened in 1910 in the Xuanwu District on the site of the former Xiyin Academy.  In 1909, he was engaged to set up the Beijing Jingshi Library, now the National Library of China, under the supervision of Ren Zheng. In 1914, he was appointed editor-in-chief of the Draft History of Qing.

Over his lifetime, Miao collected 100,000 volumes in his so-called "Yifengtang" collection.

Miao died at home suddenly in Shanghai on 22 December 1919. His book collection was mostly sold within a year. His son, Miao Lubao, sent his father's collection of gold and stones to Beijing, where most of them were incorporated into the collections of the Peking University Library.  In total, Miao had lived in 16 provinces.

Bibliography 

Miao authored over 200 volumes and edited many more.

Yifengtang Collection bibliography and catalogues 

 Articles in the Yifengtang Collection
 Secretary of the Yifengtang Collection
 Records of Studies of the Yifengtang Collection
 Continued Records of the Yifengtang Collection
 Stele Inscriptions in the Yifengtang Collection

As editor 

 Answers to Questions of Bibliography, compiled on behalf of Zhang Zhidong and later supplemented by Fan Xizeng's Supplementary Answers to Questions of Bibliography
 Further Summaries of the Siku Quanshu
 Catalogue of the Library of the Qing Education Ministry
 Catalogue of the Local Records in the Library of the Qing Education Ministry
 Continued Collected Stele Biographies, a continuation of Collected Stele Biographies by Qian Yiji
 Lyrical Records of Changzhou
 Chronology of Statesmen of the Northern and Southern Dynasties
 Outlines of Recent Literature

Local chronicles 

 Shun Tianfu Chronicles (1885, rev. 1889), compiled on behalf of Zhang Zhidong: a gazetteer of the Beijing metropolitan area
 Records of Hubei
 Records of Jiangsu
 Records of Jiangyin County

As compiler and publisher 

 Books of Unrestrained Clouds (1883)
 Arranged Fragments of Fragrant Lotus Roots
 Essay of the Eastern Hall of Misty Images
 Books of the Rain-Facing Pavilion

References 

1844 births
1919 deaths
Chinese educators
Chinese academics